Hasanboy Marfjon Ugli Dusmatov (born 24 June 1993) is an Uzbekistani professional boxer. As an amateur, Dusmatov won a gold medal at the 2016 Summer Olympics and 2013 Summer Universiade as a light flyweight. He also three-time Asian Amateur Boxing Champion.

Amateur career

Olympic result
Rio 2016
Round of 16: Defeated Joselito Velázquez (Mexico) 3–0
Quarter-finals: Defeated Birzhan Zhakypov (Kazakhstan) 3–0
Semi-finals: Defeated Nico Hernandez (United States) 3–0
Final: Defeated Yuberjen Martínez (Colombia) 3–0

World Championships result
Hamburg 2017
Round of 16: Defeated Robinson Rodríguez (Costa Rica) 5–0
Quarter-finals: Defeated Amit Panghal (India) 5–0
Semi-finals: Defeated Yuberjen Martínez (Colombia) 5–0
Final: Defeated by Joahnys Argilagos (Cuba) 3–2

Asian Games result
Jakarta Palembang 2018
Round of 16: Defeated Khamphouvanh Khamsathone (Loas) 5–0
Quarter-finals: Defeated Mirlan Turkbai Uulu (Kyrgyzstan) 5–0
Semi-finals: Defeated Wu Zhonglin (China) 5–0
Final: Defeated by Amit Panghal (India) 3–2

Professional career

Early career
On 16 November 2019, Dusmatov made his professional debut against Jesus Cervantes Villanueva of Mexico. Dusmatov won the bout after knocking Villanueva out with a heavy left hand to the body during the second round. Over a year after his debut, Dusmatov made his second appearance as a professional against Odiljon Sotkinov on 24 December 2020. Dumsatov dominated the bout from the outset and succeeded in knocking his opponent down four times on route to a knockout win in the opening round.

On 3 April 2021, Dusmatov fought against Muhsin Kizota. Dusmatov started the bout aggressively and dropped his opponent with a left hook during the opening minute of the first round. Kizota managed to recover from the knock down, however Dusmatov continued to pressure his opponent in the second round and landed another heavy left hand which put Kizota on the canvas for a second time. Despite Kizota once again rising back to his feet for a second time, Dusmatov immediately landed another heavy left hand which knocked his opponent down for a third time. This resulted in referee, Andriy Baliasov promptly ending the bout. Dusmatov was scheduled to face Jose Rivas on 17 December 2021. He won the fight by a fifth-round stoppage, as Rivas opted to retire from the fight at the end of the round. Dustamov knocked Rivas down with a right straight in the fourth round and began to take the fight over from that point onward.

Professional boxing record

References

External links

 

1993 births
Living people
People from Andijan
Uzbekistani male boxers
Boxers at the 2016 Summer Olympics
Olympic boxers of Uzbekistan
Olympic gold medalists for Uzbekistan
Olympic medalists in boxing
Medalists at the 2016 Summer Olympics
Universiade medalists in boxing
AIBA World Boxing Championships medalists
Boxers at the 2018 Asian Games
Asian Games silver medalists for Uzbekistan
Asian Games medalists in boxing
Medalists at the 2018 Asian Games
Boxers at the 2014 Asian Games
Universiade gold medalists for Uzbekistan
Light-flyweight boxers
Medalists at the 2013 Summer Universiade
21st-century Uzbekistani people